Michal Vejsada (born 26 March 1960) is a Czech wrestler. He competed in the men's Greco-Roman 62 kg at the 1980 Summer Olympics.

References

1960 births
Living people
Czech male sport wrestlers
Olympic wrestlers of Czechoslovakia
Wrestlers at the 1980 Summer Olympics
Sportspeople from Prague